Altina is an urban neighborhood of Belgrade, the capital of Serbia. Located in the Belgrade's municipality of Zemun, it is one of the newest and fastest growing parts of the city.

Location 
Altina is located just out of the north-western section of the Belgrade City urban proper (uža teritorija grada), 11 kilometers west of downtown Belgrade. It borders the neighborhoods of Galenika on the north, Zemun Bačka on the east, Vojni Put I and Plavi Horizonti on the south while on the west the neighborhood extends in the direction of Zemun Polje. Northern and eastern borders of Altina are marked by the sharp elbow turn of the road of Novosadski put, Dobanovački put marks the southern one, with Pazovački put and Ugrinovački put running through the middle of the neighborhood.

History 
Until the middle 1990s the area was virtually uninhabited with only few storehouse facilities. With the outbreak of the Yugoslav Wars in 1991, and especially after the 1995 Oluja operation, many refugees settled in this area, which resulted in creation of several new settlements (Altina, Plavi Horizonti, Grmovac, Busije). Altina grew into the small town, with over 50 streets, adjoining the Zemun's western urban area. Local community of Nova Galenika which covers the neighborhoods of Galenika, Nova Galenika and Altina had a population of 12,533 in 2002, but as over 100,000 refugees gained Serbian citizenship after the 2002 census, newspapers and the municipality of Zemun gives and estimate of 18,000 to 20,000 inhabitants for combined population of Altina and Plavi Horizonti (without Galenika).

Characteristics 
As a result of non-planned, accelerated growth Altina grew almost into the slum. After 2000, the urbanistic arrangement of the settlement began: the roads were paved, streets, which were enumerated (Altina 1, 2, 3, etc.), got names and the public transportation reached Altina (bus lines number 81 i 81L), but many problems concerning the basic communal infrastructure remain. Despite that, over 1,000 small family companies and shops operate in Altina. Also, the terrain is rich in underground waters, which flooded the settlement in 2005 and 2006.

Construction of the first park in the neighborhood was announced in May 2020. The  large park will be located in the northern part of Altina. Construction began in January 2021. It will include decorative and drinking fountains, children's playground, sculptures and outdoor gym. It will be one of the largest parks in the city's outer neighborhoods.

References 

Neighborhoods of Belgrade